Kinopoisk (a portmanteau of "cinema" and "search") is a Russian online database of information related to films, TV shows including cast, production team, biographies, plot summaries, ratings, and reviews. Since 2018 (as КиноПоиск HD) also a subscription video on demand streaming service with several thousand films, TV series, cartoons and including premieres and exclusive ones, has also been available.

In 2013, Kinopoisk was purchased by Yandex, one of Russia's largest IT companies. In 2015, KinoPoisk underwent a total redesign. However, the new design was met with strong criticism by both users and the media for its inferior functionality and slower loading time. Within four days Yandex reverted the site to its former design that remains in use to this day. 

It is one of the most popular movie portals of the Runet. The website has 93 million visits per month. Among the sites dedicated to films, it occupies the 3rd place in the world in terms of traffic, giving way to the IMDb portal and the Chinese Douban.

References

External links 
 

2003 establishments in Russia
Russian film websites
Internet properties established in 2003
Video on demand services
Online film databases
Yandex